Axis Of are a three-piece alternative rock band from Portstewart, Northern Ireland. The band is composed of Niall Lawlor (guitar, vocals) and Ewen Friers (bass, vocals).

History
Axis Of formed in 2007, and after various line up changes they released debut single "Brobdingnagian" in late 2009, launching in Belfast in January 2010. Since early 2010 the band have enjoyed a rise in popularity, partly due to the release of their second single "Port Na Spaniagh", which was released along with a music video, available on YouTube.

Following one of the band's UK tours in early 2010, Rock Sound magazine dubbed them "the most exciting band to come out of Northern Ireland, possibly ever" and gave them a 9/10 rating for their live performance at a show in Newcastle. As a result of this coverage the band were subsequently asked to take part in a Maida Vale Studios session in January 2011. 

On 10 October 2012 they announced that they signed with Derry based label Smalltown America Records. Their début album was released in Autumn 2012 and titled Finding St Kilda.

Touring
Axis Of have supported Therapy?, The King Blues, Deaf Havana, Twin Atlantic, The Joy Formidable, Lower Than Atlantis, The Bronx and frnkiero andthe cellabration.

Members
 Niall Lawlor – Guitar, vocals
 Ewen Friers – Bass, vocals

Former members
 Ethan Harman  – Drums, percussion, vocals (2010–2015)
 Gybb Harrison  – Drums, percussion(2007–2010)

Touring musicians
 Andrew Coles – drums

Discography

Studio albums

Singles

References

External links 
 Axis Of on Myspace
 
 

Alternative rock groups from Northern Ireland
Punk rock groups from Northern Ireland
Musical groups established in 2007
British hardcore punk groups
British musical trios
Rock music duos